The Lizard Head Wilderness is a wilderness area in southwest Colorado. It contains  and is jointly managed by the Uncompahgre and San Juan National Forests. Due to the steepness of the cliffs and the poor quality of the rock for fixing ropes, only experienced mountaineers should attempt to summit the spire. Another  of trails in this infrequently visited wilderness, are also strenuous and should be attempted by more advanced backpackers.

The area includes three prominent fourteeners: El Diente Peak, Wilson Peak, and Mount Wilson. The area includes the headwaters of the west fork of the Dolores River.

References

Protected areas of Dolores County, Colorado
Protected areas of San Miguel County, Colorado
Wilderness areas of Colorado
Protected areas established in 1980
Uncompahgre National Forest
San Juan National Forest